The Vallée Blanche Cable Car, (previously ), is a passenger cable car linking a mountain peak above Courmayeur (Italy) to a peak above Chamonix (France) by passing over the Mont Blanc massif, in the Alps. The engineering was developed by Vittorio Zignoli of Polytechnic University of Turin. No helicopters were used, and all the workers were chosen among locals and alpine guides. After a construction period of four years, it began service in 1958.

This tourist attraction spans the valleys between the two peaks, high above the Mont Blanc Tunnel, which carries automotive passenger and freight traffic under the two peaks.

System

The cabins take some 30 to 35 minutes for the whole distance, including 5 short stops corresponding the stops of the cabins arriving in the stations at either end.

The Gros Rognon station is not a passenger station—it contains the counterweights of the fixed cables and the rails bending the horizontal direction of the cables by some 8° to the right.

During construction, it was decided to build this unique configuration, because the glacier is unsuitable for high tower construction.

From this support the cable car runs  to Pointe Helbronner ( elevation).

The two peaks have their own cable car system connecting them to their nearby villages.  The French Téléphérique de l'Aiguille du Midi connects the peak of Aiguille du Midi to the village of Chamonix, while the Italian Skyway Monte Bianco (Funivie Monte Bianco) connects the peak of Pointe Helbronner to the village of La Palud, just north of Courmayeur.

Coordinates
 Aigulle du Midi: 
 Gros Rognon Angle Station: 
 Hanging Support Structure: 
 Pointe Helbronner:

Incidents
On 29 August 1961, the cable car was badly damaged when a Republic F-84F Thunderstreak  of the French Armée de l'Air tore its hauling cable. Three cars crashed and six people were killed. Pilot Bernard Ziegler landed his damaged plane safely. The upward cable was undamaged, but 81 riders had to wait many hours for rescue.

On September 8, 2016 110 people were stranded when the cable cars stopped.  They needed to be evacuated by helicopter.

References

External links 

 , the cable car operator 
 Site with pictures and map
 Technical description of the cable car 

Cable cars in France
Cable cars in Italy
Tourist attractions in Haute-Savoie
Transport in Courmayeur
1958 establishments in France
1958 establishments in Italy
Transport infrastructure completed in 1958